Alfred Kornprobst (28 July 1940 – 7 June 1991) was a German weightlifter. He competed in the men's lightweight event at the 1964 Summer Olympics.

References

1940 births
1991 deaths
German male weightlifters
Olympic weightlifters of the United Team of Germany
Weightlifters at the 1964 Summer Olympics
Sportspeople from Nuremberg